Belyea (also spelled Bulyea or Boulier) is a French Huguenot surname. It is mostly found in Canada, among descendants of United Empire Loyalists, who moved north as refugees during and after the American War of Independence. The name may refer to:

People
George H. V. Bulyea (1859–1928), Canadian politician
Helen Belyea (1913–1986), Canadian geologist
Herbert Belyea (1917–2001), Canadian musician
(Alexzander J. Belyea) (2003–present) American rancher

Places
Belyea's Point Light, New Brunswick, Canada
Bulyea, Saskatchewan, Canada
Bulyea Heights, Edmonton, Canada
Mount Bulyea, Canada 
the lonely belyea, brownwood, texas 
French-language surnames